International Journal of Physical Distribution & Logistics Management is a peer-reviewed academic journal which focuses on business logistics, supply chain management, physical distribution, and marketing channels.  Founded in 1970, it is published ten times per year by Emerald Group Publishing Limited.

History
The journal was established in 1970 as International Journal of Physical Distribution (ISSN 0020-7527). A monograph series called PDM Physical Distribution Monograph (ISSN 0305-2214) was also established at that time; in 1974 its title was changed to IJPD Monograph (ISSN 0308-4264), and in 1975 it was incorporated into the journal.  In 1977 the journal's title was changed to International Journal of Physical Distribution and Materials Management (ISSN 0269-8218), and in 1990 the current title was adopted.

Volumes are numbered by year, but the number of issues per volume has varied.  The first two volumes had only 3 issues, but volumes 3-7 had 6 issues each.  The journal has had 10 issues per volume since v.35 (2005), although in some of those volumes there have been combined issues. Content is available online from Emerald Insight or, after a 12-month embargo, from ABI/INFORM Complete.

The current editor in chief is Prefossor Chee-Yew Wong (Leeds University Business School - UK).

Abstracting and indexing
The journal is abstracted and indexed in the following databases:
 Social Sciences Citation Index
 Scopus
 Business Source Premier
 Academic Onefile
 Business Insights: Essentials
 ABI/INFORM Complete
 Research Library Complete

According to the "Journal Citation Reports" the journal has a 2018 impact factor of 5.212.

References

External links

Business and management journals
Publications established in 1970
English-language journals
Emerald Group Publishing academic journals
10 times per year journals
Transportation journals